Czajka (lapwing in Polish) may refer to:

 Aero-Kros MP-02 Czajka, a 2000s Polish light aircraft
 Kocjan Czajka, a pre-war Polish glider
 , a Polish minesweeper
 SZD-18 Czajka, a post-war Polish glider
 WS-3 Czajka, a 1950s Polish light aircraft
 Czajka (surname)

See also
 
 Chayka (disambiguation)